St Margaret's Church is a Church of England parish church in Angmering, West Sussex. The church is a grade II* listed building.

History

St Margaret's Church was built in the 13th century. A tower was added in 1507. The church was re-order by Samuel Sanders Teulon from 1852 to 1853.

On 12 October 1954, the church was designated a grade II* listed building.

Present day
St Margaret's stands in the conservative evangelical tradition of the Church of England.

Notable clergy
 The Revd Jos Nicholl MC, decorated army officer who served as rector from 1982 to 1985
 The Revd Anthony Wells, later Archdeacon of France, served as rector from 1986 to 1998
 The Revd Mark Standen, is the rector up to the present.

References

External links

 
 A Church Near You entry

13th-century church buildings in England
Church of England church buildings in West Sussex
Grade II* listed churches in West Sussex
Conservative evangelical Anglican churches in England